Sushin Shyam (born 13 February 1992) is an Indian music composer, singer and instrumentalist who works predominantly in the Malayalam cinema. He is also the keyboardist of the folk metal band The Down Troddence. He started gaining popularity in 2018 with the films Varathan and Kumbalangi Nights in 2019.  Sushin is a recipient of Kerala State Film Award for Best Music Director in 2019 for Kumbalangi Nights.

Sushin's career as an independent composer started with the film Sapthamashree Thaskaraha (2014) in which, he composed the background score of the film. His debut as a singer was through the film Neelakasham Pachakadal Chuvanna Bhoomi (2013) in which, he sang the song "Thaazhvaram" for composer Rex Vijayan. Besides being a musician, Sushin has done several acting roles in films. He has also performed in the song "Aadharanjali" from the film Romancham (2022) which was composed by himself.

Early life
Sushin was educated at St.Joseph's Higher Secondary School, Thalassery, and at Mambaram Higher Secondary School in Thalassery. His father, being a musician, taught him to play the keyboard at a very young age. He first performed on stage at age 9. Sushin participated in youth festivals and won a number of state awards during his school years. He went on to study engineering in Sri Sidhartha Institute of technology but dropped out to pursue his career in music.  He shifted to Chennai to explore opportunities in the film music. He joined with Music director Deepak Dev and worked with him for over two years.

Sushin worked as a keyboard programmer under the composer Rasheed for the latter's album song, "Akalukayano," which became popular with the kerala audience and became a trending song. Sushin joined with The Down Troddence, which was originally started as a home studio project by musicians Varun and Munz in 2008, on the keyboard. In 2010, The Down Troddence performed live as a six-piece band with Sushin. Their debut album How Are You? We Are Fine, Thank You was released in 2014. Sushin was nominated for Best Keyboardist award (critics' choice and popular choice) in Rolling Stone Metal Awards 2015, for the album.

Career as music composer
Sushin started his film career at the age of 19 with Deepak Dev as his mentor. Assisting Deepak Dev, he has programmed background scores for over forty-five Malayalam, Tamil and Telugu movies in the span of four years. He composed music for the short film Oru kutti chodyam directed by Ganesh Raj in 2012. In 2013, Music director Rex Vijayan invited Sushin to programme the background score for Neelakasham Pachakadal Chuvanna Bhoomi. Sushin also sang a song, "Thaazhvaram," for the film. Meeting Rex was a turning point for Sushin as Rex encouraged Sushin to compose the background score for his next film Sapthamashree Thaskaraha in 2014. It was his first independent project as a composer. He also sang the track "Kayi Ethum Doorathonde" for the film. Thereafter, he composed the background score for Lord Livingstone 7000 Kandi in 2015. His next work was Kismath, directed by debutant Shanavas Bavakkutty. He composed the background score and one song ("Kissa Pathiyil") for the film; both were well received. In 2016, he composed music for the short film Vicky, directed by Manu Joseph. His next release was Ezra, in early 2017, a horror mystery film directed by Jay.K. He composed the score and two songs ("Thambiraan" and "Irulu Neelum Raave") for Ezra. Both the songs and background score were well received. He also did background scores for films Villain and The Great Father in 2017. In 2018, Sushin composed songs and score for three movies - Maradona, Lilli and Varathan. The songs and soundtrack from Varathan went on to become top hits. Kumbalangi Nights and Virus were Sushin's 2019 releases. Sushin's compositions for both films were widely acclaimed and appreciated. He co-composed background score with Jackson Vijayan for Anwar Rasheed's Trance, which was released in February 2020. His next release was Kappela. He also did background score for Kilometers and Kilometers, starring Tovino Thomas, in 2020.

Sushin's 2021 releases were Malik, Kurup and Minnal Murali. The song "Raheemun Aleemun"  from Malik sung by Hida Chokkad, an eight-year-old girl from Malappuram became an instant hit and went viral on internet. Both Sushin's music and Hida's soulful rendition gained much appreciation. The song "Theerame Theerame" also gained top positions among the year's hit charts. The multilingual crime thriller Kurup got a mixed response from critics, but Sushin's music and score were highly appreciated. The soundtrack album for the superhero movie Minnal Murali also went on to become very popular. Sajin Srijith of The New Indian Express stated the soundtrack as "instantly addictive" and "carries the goodness of western retro hits". He also composed four songs for the movie, which were also well received.

His first release of 2022 is Bheeshma Parvam, directed by Amal Neerad starring Mammootty. The soundtrack album for Bheeshma Parvam turned to be one of the biggest hits in Sushin's career, especially the track "Parudeesa" receiving highly positive reviews from critics. The New Indian Express stated that "Sushin Shyam’s instantly immersive music alternates between various genres, from classical to contemporary and, at one point, evokes one of the spaghetti-western scores of Ennio Morricone." The critic Veeyen wrote, "Sushin Shyam’s arresting musical score leaves an extensive impression, and the upbeat track Parudeesa stands out from among the lot."

Acting roles
Sushin has appeared in short or guest roles in movies including Grandmaster, Thattathin Marayathu, Da Thadiya, Honey Bee, Guppy and Mayaanadhi.

Discography

As music composer

As playback singer

Awards

See also
 Kerala State Film Award for Best Music Director
 Bheeshma Parvam (soundtrack)
 Kumbalangi Nights (soundtrack)

References

External links
 
 
 

Living people
Malayalam film score composers
Film musicians from Kerala
21st-century Indian composers
1992 births